Autódromo Juan María Traverso is a  motorsports circuit located in San Nicolás de los Arroyos, Argentina. The circuit was inaugurated on 7 October 2018 and its original name was Autódromo San Nicolás Ciudad. On 30 October 2022, its name was changed to Autódromo Juan María Traverso on behalf of Juan María Traverso, who was one of the promoters of the construction of the racetrack. It has hosted national events, such as Turismo Carretera, TC2000 Championship and Turismo Nacional.

Lap records 

The official fastest race lap records at the Autódromo Juan María Traverso are listed as:

References

External Links
Official website

Autódromo Juan María Traverso